Connor Blakely (born 2 March 1996) is an Australian rules footballer who plays for the Gold Coast Suns in the Australian Football League (AFL), having initially been drafted to the Fremantle Football Club.

Early career

Originally from Bunbury, Western Australia, he was drafted with the 34th selection in the 2014 National Draft from Swan Districts in the West Australian Football League (WAFL). He made his league debut in 2013, and then in 2014 played all season in Swan Districts league team. He also represented Western Australia at the 2014 AFL Under 18 Championships, where he was selected to the tournament's All-Australian team. In 2015 he played for Peel Thunder in the West Australian Football League (WAFL), Fremantle's reserve team.

AFL career

Blakely was selected to make his AFL debut for Fremantle in the final round of the 2015 AFL season, when Fremantle sent a weakened team to play Port Adelaide at the Adelaide Oval. Twelve changes were made to the team, and Blakely was one of four players to make their AFL debuts.

In July 2019, Blakely signed a three year contract extension with Fremantle, to remain at the club until the end of 2022.

Statistics
 Statistics are correct to the end of round 10, 2022

|- style="background-color: #EAEAEA"
! scope="row" style="text-align:center" | 2015
|style="text-align:center;"|
| 19 || 1 || 0 || 0 || 3 || 9 || 12 || 1 || 1 || 0.0 || 0.0 || 3.0 || 9.0 || 12.0 || 1.0 || 1.0 || 0
|- 
! scope="row" style="text-align:center" | 2016
|style="text-align:center;"|
| 19 || 15 || 1 || 6 || 129 || 175 || 304 || 40 || 56 || 0.1 || 0.4 || 8.6 || 11.7 || 20.3 || 2.7 || 3.7 || 3
|- style="background-color: #EAEAEA"
! scope="row" style="text-align:center" | 2017
|style="text-align:center;"|
| 19 || 17 || 1 || 4 || 210 || 196 || 406 || 88 || 67 || 0.1 || 0.2 || 12.4 || 11.5 || 23.9 || 5.2 || 3.9 || 5
|- 
! scope="row" style="text-align:center" | 2018
|style="text-align:center;"|
| 19 || 13 || 0 || 1 || 172 || 137 || 309 || 92 || 33 || 0.0 || 0.1 || 13.2 || 10.5 || 23.8 || 7.1 || 2.5 || 1
|- style="background-color: #EAEAEA"
! scope="row" style="text-align:center" | 2019
|style="text-align:center;"|
| 19 || 14 || 0 || 0 || 156 || 121 || 277 || 72 || 32 || 0.0 || 0.0 || 11.1 || 8.6 || 19.8 || 5.1 || 2.3 || 0
|- 
! scope="row" style="text-align:center" | 2020
|style="text-align:center;"|
| 19 || 5 || 0 || 0 || 26 || 49 || 75 || 12 || 12 || 0.0 || 0.0 || 5.2 || 9.8 || 15.0 || 2.4 || 2.4 || 0
|- style="background-color: #EAEAEA"
! scope="row" style="text-align:center" | 2021
|style="text-align:center;"|
| 19 || 13 || 1 || 2 || 50 || 66 || 116 || 30 || 11 || 0.1 || 0.2 || 3.8 || 5.1 || 8.9 || 2.3 || 0.8 || 0
|- 
! scope="row" style="text-align:center" | 2022
|style="text-align:center;"|
| 19 || 0 || – || – || – || – || – || – || – || – || – || – || – || – || – || – || –
|- class="sortbottom"
! colspan=3| Career
! 78
! 3
! 13
! 746
! 753
! 1499
! 335
! 212
! 0.0
! 0.2
! 9.6
! 9.7
! 19.2
! 4.3
! 2.7
! 9
|}

Notes

References

External links

WAFL Player Profile and Statistics

1996 births
Living people
Fremantle Football Club players
Peel Thunder Football Club players
Swan Districts Football Club players
Australian rules footballers from Western Australia